Corr or CORR may refer to:

People with the name
Andrea Corr (born 1974), Irish musician
Barry Corr (born 1985), Irish footballer
Barry John Corr (born 1981), Scottish footballer
Bill Corr, American government official
Caroline Corr (born 1973), Irish musician
Cathal Corr (born 1987), Australian rules footballer
Edwin G. Corr (born 1934), American diplomat
Erin Corr (1793–1862), Irish engraver
Isabelle Marie Françoise Corr (1807–1883), Belgian painter of Irish descent and sister of Erin Corr
Frank J. Corr (1877–1934), American politician
Ida Corr (born 1977), Danish musician
Jim Corr (born 1964), Irish musician
Jim Corr (politician) (born 1934), Irish politician
Karen Corr (born 1969), Irish pool player
Liam Corr (born 1990), Scottish footballer
Nick Corr, Australian record executive
Pat Corr (born 1927), Northern Irish footballer
Peter Corr (1923–2001), Irish footballer
Ryan Corr (born 1989), Australian actor
Sharon Corr (born 1970), Irish musician
Tom Corr (born 1962), Irish boxer

Places in Ireland
 Corr, Ballymorin, a townland in the civil parish of Ballymorin
 Corr, County Cavan, a townland of County Cavan
 Corr, County Galway, a townland of County Galway
 Corr, County Tyrone, a townland of County Tyrone
 Corr, Kilkenny West, a townland in the civil parish of Kilkenny West

Other uses 
 Championship Off-Road Racing, American organization (1998–2008)
 Clinical Orthopaedics and Related Research, an American medical journal established in 1953
 Computing Research Repository (CoRR), the computer science section of the arXiv preprint repository
 CoRR hypothesis (co-location for redox regulation) in cell biology
 The Corrs, an Irish music band

See also
Coor (disambiguation)